Trotters is an unincorporated community in Golden Valley County, North Dakota, United States. The community did not receive telephone service until 1972, and Highway 16, its only road, was paved in the 1980s.

Name
Trotters was named after Francis Leighton Trotter (surname sometimes Trotters, 1865–1908), who served as the first postmaster in the community. Trotter carried mail from Wibaux, Montana for a year without pay in order to establish the post office.

History
Leonard Hall, who moved to Trotters in 1956, was the town's only resident for much of the twentieth century. The post office also served as the town's grocery store and gas station, and Hall lived in the back of the building. Two other buildings, a disused church and an empty abandoned structure, also stood in the town. The post office closed in 1995 when Hall's poor health caused him to retire as postmaster.

Climate
According to the Köppen Climate Classification system, Trotters has a semi-arid climate, abbreviated "BSk" on climate maps.

References

Unincorporated communities in Golden Valley County, North Dakota
Unincorporated communities in North Dakota